Ahsan Iqbal Chaudhary (born 28 March 1959) is a Pakistani engineer and politician who is serving as the Secretary General of Pakistan Muslim League (N). He is a member of the National Assembly of Pakistan since August 2018. Previously, he was a member of the National Assembly  from 1993 to 1999 and from 2008 to May 2018.

He served as Minister for Interior and Minister for Planning, Development and Reforms in the Abbasi cabinet from 2017 to May 2018. A leader of the Pakistan Muslim League (Nawaz), he served as the Minister of Planning and Development of Pakistan and the Deputy Chairman of Planning Commission of Pakistan in the third Sharif's ministry and briefly held the portfolio of Minister of Minorities and Minister of Education of Pakistan in the Gillani ministry in 2008. He served as the Deputy Chairman of the Planning Commission of Pakistan from 1998 to 1999 during the Sharif's second ministry. He currently serves as federal minister for planning and development since 19 April 2022.

Family and education

According to PILDAT, Chaudhary was born on 28 March 1959. According to the News International, he was born on 28 September 1958.

His mother, Nisar Fatima was the member of the National Assembly of Pakistan on reserved seats for women in 1985 Pakistani general election.

Chaudhary received his early education from the PAF College Sargodha. He attended the University of Engineering and Technology, Lahore to study mechanical engineering in 1976 from where he graduated with BSc in 1981.

In 1984, Chaudhary attended the Wharton School of the University of Pennsylvania from where he did MBA in 1986. Dawn reported that he also attended Government College Lahore, Georgetown University and Harvard University.

Political career 
Chaudhary started politics as president of the student union of University of Engineering and Technology. He was then associated with Islami Jamiat Tulaba, student wing of the right wing Jamat-i-Islami.

In 1993 Pakistani general election, he became member of the National Assembly for the first time after winning constituency NA-117 of Narowal. In 1993, he served as Policy and Public Affairs Assistant to then Prime Minister of Pakistan.

He was re-elected as the member of the National Assembly for the second time in 1997 Pakistani general election. when his party PML-N won clear majority in National Assembly for the first time in the history of Pakistan, Chaudhary played his role in several key government positions. He was appointed as the Deputy Chairman of the Planning Commission of Pakistan with the title of Minister of State, chairman Pakistan Engineering Council and was also a chairman for the National Steering Committees on Information Technology and IQM and Productivity. Chaudhary continued on the positions allotted to him till the 1999 Pakistani coup d'état in which then Chief of Army Staff, Pervez Musharraf, overthrew elected Prime Minister Nawaz Sharif and his existing elected government. Dawn reported that on Chaudhary's initiative Pakistan's first national IT policy was formulated.

In 2002 Pakistani general election, he lost the National Assembly seat. During the Musharraf rule, Chaudhary taught management at the Mohammad Ali Jinnah University in Islamabad from 2000 to 2007. Chaudhary is considered a loyalist of Nawaz Sharif who kept the PML-N alive during the Musharraf rule.

In 2008 Pakistani general election, Chaudhary was re-elected as the member of the National Assembly for the third time. He briefly served as the Minister for Education of Pakistan with an additional portfolio of Minister of Minorities' Affairs in the Gillani ministry. But after PML-N decided to sit on opposition benches due to a disagreement with PPP related to the reinstatement of the judges dismissed by former President Pervez Musharraf in 2007, he resigned six weeks into the newly formed PPP-led coalition government.

In 2011, Chaudhary was elected as Deputy Secretary General of PML-N.

In 2013 Pakistani general election, Chaudhary was made part of PML-N's central parliamentary board tasked with selecting candidates for the election. Chaudhary was re-elected as the member of the National Assembly for the fourth time in 2013 general election. He was appointed as the Minister of Planning and Development as well the Deputy Chairman of Planning Commission of Pakistan.

In February 2016, Chaudhary was appointed as the United Nations Development Programme's 'champion minister' from the Asia Pacific region in recognition of his efforts to promote the Sustainable Development Goals.

In July 2017, the federal cabinet, which included Chaudhary was disbanded following the resignation of Prime Minister Nawaz Sharif after the Panama Papers case decision. Following the election of Shahid Khaqan Abbasi as Prime Minister of Pakistan, Chaudhary was inducted into the federal cabinet of Abbasi and was appointed Minister for Interior for the first time. On 16 September 2017, he was given the additional charge of Ministry of Planning and Development. In November 2017, he was criticised by the Chairman of the Senate of Pakistan Raza Rabbani for not taking Senate in confidence with regards to the crackdown against the 2017 Tehreek-e-Labaik protest which led to resignation of Minister for Law and Justice, Zahid Hamid. Upon the dissolution of the National Assembly on the expiration of its term on 31 May 2018, Chaudhry ceased to hold the office as Federal Minister for Interior and Federal Minister for Planning, Development and Reform.

He was re-elected to the National Assembly as a candidate of PML-N from Constituency NA-78 (Narowal-II) in 2018 Pakistani general election. He received 159,651 votes and defeated Abrar-ul-Haq.

He was arrested on 23 December 2019 by NAB , over Narowal sports complex corruption charges., Released after 90 days in custody, after NAB failed to come up with a case against him.

Assassination attempt
In May 2018, Chaudhary was shot and wounded at a political rally in his home constituency Narowal in an apparent assassination attempt. He was airlifted from Narowal to Lahore for surgery where he was said to be in stable condition. The attacker, found to be linked with Tehreek-e-Labaik, was arrested from the spot who in his police statement confessed that he tried to assassinate Chaudhry

References

1959 births
Living people
Punjabi people
University of Engineering and Technology, Lahore alumni
Government College University, Lahore alumni
Wharton School of the University of Pennsylvania alumni
Harvard University alumni
Pakistan Muslim League (N) politicians
Nawaz Sharif administration
Education Ministers of Pakistan
Politicians from Lahore
Pakistani MNAs 1993–1996
Pakistani MNAs 1997–1999
Pakistani MNAs 2008–2013
Pakistani MNAs 2013–2018
Interior ministers of Pakistan
Pakistani MNAs 2018–2023
Pakistani prisoners and detainees
PAF College Sargodha alumni